Birutė Šakickienė (born 26 November 1968) is a Lithuanian rower who won an Olympic bronze medal in the Double Sculls event at the 2000 Summer Olympics in Sydney. She also competed at the 1996 Summer Olympics.

References

External links
 Link to International Olympic Committee Website – Search results for Birute Sakickiene. Retrieved 1 July 2010

1968 births
Living people
Lithuanian female rowers
Rowers at the 1996 Summer Olympics
Rowers at the 2000 Summer Olympics
Olympic rowers of Lithuania
Olympic bronze medalists for Lithuania
Olympic medalists in rowing
Medalists at the 2000 Summer Olympics
Lithuanian Sports University alumni